Rhizus may also refer to Ριζαίον on the Black Sea, modern Rize.

Rhizus or Rhizous was a town and polis of Magnesia in ancient Thessaly, whose inhabitants were transported by Demetrios Poliorketes to Demetrias upon the foundation of the latter city. We learn from Periplus of Pseudo-Scylax that Rhizus was outside the Pagasaean Gulf upon the exterior (Aegean) shore. In Strabo's time, it was a village dependent on Demetrias. Coins minted by Rhizus have been found, dated in the 4th century BCE.

The site of Rhizus is at the modern village of Tarsanas (Ταρσανάς).

References

External links
 Ancient Thessaly
 Ancient Greek Coins
 NumisWiki
 The Geography of Strabo
 Classical Numismatic Group

Populated places in ancient Thessaly
Cities in ancient Greece
Ancient Magnesia
Former populated places in Greece
Thessalian city-states